The  is a railway line operated by West Japan Railway Company (JR West) in Fukui Prefecture, Japan. The line extends 52.5 km (32.6 mi) from Echizen-Hanandō Station in Fukui to Kuzuryūko Station in Ōno with a total of 22 stations.

The line was originally planned to connect to what is now the Nagaragawa Railway, but the last 24.0 km (14.9 mi) section that would have involved extensive tunneling was never commenced. A bus service provided a connection between the two lines until it ceased in 2002.

Route data 
Operating Company: 
West Japan Railway Company (Services and tracks)
Distance:
Echizen-Hanandō — Kuzuryūko: 52.5 km / 32.6 mi.
Gauge: 
Stations: 22
Double-tracking: None
Electrification: Not electrified
Railway signalling:
Echizen-Hanandō — Echizen-Ōno: Simplified automatic
Echizen-Ōno — Kuzuryūko Station: Staff token

Stations 
 All trains stop at all stations.
 Between  and  trains run on the Hokuriku Main Line.
 All stations located in Fukui Prefecture.

Legend
 ◇ - stations with passing loops
 ∥ - double-tracked section
 ｜- single-tracked section
 Y - junction station

History

December 15, 1960: Minami-Fukui — Echizen-Hanandō — Kadohara section (43.1 km) opens. Freight operations begin between Minami-Fukui — Echizen-Ōno.
Echizen-Hanandō, Rokujō, Echizen-Tōgō, Ichijōdani, Ichinami, Kowashōzu, Miyama, Echizen-Yakushi, Echizen-Ōmiya, Hakariishi, Ushigahara, Echizen-Ōno, Echizen-Tomida, Shimo-Yuino, Kakigashima, Kadohara stations open.
 May 20, 1964: Asuwa, Echizen-Takada, Echizen-Tano stations open.
 October 15, 1965: Freight operations begin between Echizen-Ōno — Kadohara.
 March 25, 1968: Kita-Ōno Station opens.
 October 1, 1968: Freight operations end at Kadohara Station.
 December 15, 1972: Extension from Kadohara to Kuzuryūko (10.2 km) opens, including the 5251m Arashima tunnel.
 April 1, 1973: Freight operations end between Echizen-Ōno — Echizen-Tomida 
 October 1980: Seasonal rapid train "Okuetsu-gō" begins operation.
 November 15, 1982: Freight operations end between Minami-Fukui — Echizen-Ōno, ending freight service on the entire line.
 April 1, 1987: With the breakup and privatization of Japan National Railways, line becomes part of West Japan Railway Company (JR West). Beginning of line moved 800 meters to Echizen-Hanandō Station.
 June 1, 1990: Driver-only operation begins.
 September 1, 1992: Regular rapid service begins.
 September 12, 1995: "Kuzuryū Line" name goes into use.
 September 1, 1997: Seasonal rapid train "Okuetsu-gō" ceases operation.
 March 3, 2001: Regular rapid service ends.
 July 18, 2004: Due to heavy rains, five railway bridges are washed away, forcing operations to stop.
 July 20, 2004: Service restored between Echizen-Ōno — Kuzuryūko.
 September 11, 2004: Service restored between Echizen-Hanandō — Ichijōdani, Miyama — Echizen-Ōno.
 June 30, 2007: Service restored between Ichijōdani — Miyama, allowing full service on the line to resume.

See also
 List of railway lines in Japan

References

 
Lines of West Japan Railway Company
Rail transport in Fukui Prefecture
Railway lines opened in 1960
1067 mm gauge railways in Japan
Fukui (city)
Ōno, Fukui